MV Aureol  was a mid-sized British ocean liner, originally put into service for Elder Dempster Lines of Liverpool in 1951.  She was constructed on the River Clyde in Glasgow by Alexander Stephen and Sons. At 537 feet long and measuring  14,083 gross register tons, Aureol had room for 329 passengers and carried 145 crew. She spent her entire Elder Dempster career on the UK-Lagos passenger cargo service. From 1951 to 1972 she sailed from Liverpool, but closure of the landing stage and the hope of better loadings led to her being transferred to Southampton (first departure 26 April 1972) for the last two years of her service.

Aureol arrived at Southampton at the end of her final Elder Dempster voyage on 18 October 1974. She was purchased by Greek oil tycoon Yiannis Latsis, and renamed Marianna VI after one of his daughters.  In 1989 she was laid up at Eleusina and did not sail again until 2001, when she moved to the Indian port of Alang to be beached and broken up for scrap.

References

1951 ships
Ships built in Govan
Ocean liners